22nd U-boat Flotilla ("22. Unterseebootsflottille") was formed in January 1941 in Gotenhafen under the command of Korvettenkapitän Wilhelm Ambrosius. The flotilla was disbanded in May 1945.

Flotilla commanders

References 

22
Military units and formations established in 1941
Military units and formations disestablished in 1945